The Las Vegas Raiders  are a professional American football team based in the Las Vegas Valley. The Raiders compete in the National Football League (NFL) as a member club of the league's American Football Conference (AFC) West division. Their stadium is located in Paradise, Nevada. There have been 22 head coaches in Oakland, Los Angeles, and Las Vegas franchise history. The Raiders franchise was founded in Oakland, California in 1959 and became the eighth member of the American Football League (AFL) in 1960 as a replacement for the Minnesota Vikings, who had moved to the NFL. The Raiders joined the NFL in 1970, after the AFL–NFL merger. They played in Los Angeles between 1982 and 1995, before returning to Oakland. As of the end of the 2015 season, the Raiders have played 852 games in a total of 56 seasons in the AFL and NFL. In those games, two coaches have won the Super Bowl with the team: John Madden in 1976 and Tom Flores in 1980 and 1983. One coach, John Rauch in 1966, won the AFL Championship. Five other coaches, Art Shell, Jack Del Rio, Jon Gruden, Bill Callahan, and Rich Bisaccia, have also taken the Raiders to the playoffs. Callahan led the Raiders to the Super Bowl. He did this in his first year as head coach of the team.

Shell and Gruden are the only coaches to have more than one tenure with the team, and Flores and Shell are the only coaches to have coached the team in both Oakland and Los Angeles. Gruden is the only coach to have coached the team in both Oakland and Las Vegas. Rauch is statistically the best, with a winning percentage of .805. However, the all-time leader in both games coached and wins is Madden, with 142 and 103 respectively. Of the 20 Raiders coaches, Al Davis, Madden, and Flores are the only Raider coaches to be inducted into the Pro Football Hall of Fame for their contributions as coaches. Davis, who was also the Managing General partner and an AFL Commissioner, was in the Hall of Fame class of 1992. Madden was in the 2006 class. Flores was in the 2021 class. Two coaches, Flores and Shell, are also former players for the Raiders. Shell was also inducted into the Hall of Fame in 1989, but as a player.  The current coach is Josh McDaniels, who was hired on January 31, 2022.

Key

Coaches
Note: Statistics are accurate through the end of the 2022 NFL season.

Footnotes
 Feldman was fired five games into the 1962 season. Conkright served as interim head coach for the remaining nine games.
 Shanahan was fired four games into the 1989 season. Shell served as interim head coach for the remaining 12 games and was subsequently hired as the permanent head coach.
 Shell was inducted into the Hall of fame as a player in 1989.
 Shell had two tenures as the team's head coach.
 Kiffin was fired four games into the 2008 season. Cable served as interim head coach for the remaining 12 games and was subsequently hired as the permanent head coach.
 Allen was fired four games into the 2014 season. Sparano served as interim head coach for the remaining 12 games.
 Gruden had two tenures as the team's head coach.
 Gruden resigned five games into the 2021 season. Bisaccia served as interim head coach for the remaining 12 regular season games and one playoff game.

References
General

 
 
 
 

Specific

 
Las Vegas Raiders
Head coaches